Pure Love may refer to:

Film and TV
 Pure Love (2013 TV series), a South Korean television series
 Pure Love (2014 TV series), a Philippine television series
 Pure Love (film), a 2016 South Korean film

Music
 Pure Love (band), English-American rock band
 Pure Love (album), 1974 album by Ronnie Milsap
 "Pure Love" (Ronnie Milsap song), 1974
 "Pure Love" (Arash song), 2008
 "Pure Love", a 2013 single by Bomba Estéreo